Toyota Motor Corporation's E family is a family of 5/6-speed manual transmissions for FWD/RWD/4WD vehicles.

E5x

E50F
5 Speed Transverse Front Engine
Full Time All Wheel Drive with Viscous Coupling Limited Slip Center Differential

Gear ratios for this transmission.

Applications:
 Toyota Celica GT-Four (All-Trac) - ST165 & ST185

E51
5 Speed Transverse Mid-Mounted Engine

Gear ratios for this transmission.

Applications:
 Toyota MR2 (1988–1989 AW11) Supercharged 4A-GZE

E52
5 Speed Transverse Mounted Engine
Gear ratios for this transmission.

Applications:
 Toyota Camry 2.5L V6 (1987–1991 VZV21) 2VZ-FE

E53
"Used with the 3vz-fe engine for the 92-93 Camry & ES300."

Gear ratios for this transmission.

E55F5
Front-engine, all-wheel drive with selectable part-time function.

Gear ratios for this transmission.

Applications:
 Toyota Corolla Sedan (DLX) (All-Trac) - (Toyota Corolla (E90) - AE95 Sedan
(Sprinter Carib - Japan)

E56
Front or Mid Engine Application.

Gear ratios for this transmission.

Only available on 94-95 Toyota Celica ST202 (3S-GE) SS-II "Sport Package" - Viscous LSD (E56-07C)

E56F
Front-engine 4wd 5mt.

Gear ratios for this transmission.

APPLICATIONS:
CAMRY ALL-TRAC

CALDINA ST195G 4WD 3SFE - 3.94 Final Drive

CORONA EXIV ST205 TR-G4 & GT-4WD

CARINA ED ST205 LIMITED-4 & GT-4WD

E57F
Front-engine 4wd 5mt

Gear ratios for this transmission.

APPLICATIONS:
COROLLA ALL-TRAC

E57F5
Front Mount Transverse Engine,(4AFE) 
Full-Time 4wd 50/50-power split front/rear, with selectable 'Centre-Differential-Lock' function and open rear differential.

Gear ratios for this transmission.

Applications:
 Toyota Corolla Wagon (All-Trac) - (Toyota Corolla (E90) - AE95 Wagon) 
 Above info is possibly incorrect or they had 2 variants of this gearbox. 
 From other sources the final drive is 4.24 with a 0.82 5th gear - Also the part numbers for the diff ring gear show it to be the same as the AE115G E59F which has a final drive of 4.24.

E58
Front-engine 2wd 5mt.

Gear ratios for this transmission.

Applications:

Toyota Levin/Trueno GTZ AE101 - Viscous LSD (E58-11C = LSD)

Toyota Levin/Trueno GTZ AE92 - Optional LSD (E58-474 = Open DIff), E58-XX* -> where XX are two numbers, if * is an odd # this means LSD

E59F
Front-engine 4WD 5MT

Gear ratios for this transmission.

Applications:

Toyota Sprinter Carib AE115G 4WD 7A-FE

E15x

E150F
Gear ratios for this transmission.

Toyota Caldina GT-T ST215W (3S-GTE 4gen 260ps)
Toyota Celica All-Trac

E151F

Toyota Celica GT-Four RC ST185  (3S-GTE 2gen 235ps)

E152F

Applications:  This is close ratio gearbox in the Japanese only Toyota Celica GT-Four Rally ST185. (3S-GTE 2gen 225ps)

E153

Gear ratios for this transmission.

Applications:
 XV20 (1997-2001) Toyota Camry V6
 XV20 (1999-2002) Toyota Camry Solara V6
 SW20 (1990-1999) Toyota MR2 Turbo

E154F

Gear ratios for this transmission.

Applications:
 Toyota Celica GT-Four ST205  (3S-GTE 3gen 255ps)

E25x

E250

Gear ratios for this transmission.

Applications:

1996-2000 RAV4 3S-FE FWD

E250F

Gear ratios for this transmission.

Applications:

1996-2000 RAV4 3S-FE 4WD/AWD/4x4

E251

Gear ratios for this transmission.

Applications:

1CD-FTV CDT220 Avensis

E35x

Please, do not confuse the E35x for the E153.  The E35x has a completely different transaxle case. This E35x is also known as a "narrow" transaxle because it is about 1" narrower than the wider E series transmissions.

E350

5 Speed Transverse Front Engine

Gear ratios for this transmission.

Applications:
 2005-2010 Scion tC

E351
5 Speed Transverse Front Engine

Gear ratios for this transmission.

Applications:
 1999-2003 Toyota Avensis diesel 1cd
 2002–2009 Toyota Camry 
 2002–2008 Toyota Solara
 2008–2014 Scion xB
 2009–2012 Toyota Corolla (E140) XRS
 2009–2013 Toyota Matrix XRS

E352
5 Speed Transverse Front Engine

Gear ratios for this transmission.

Applications:
2001-2005 RAV4

E352F
5 Speed Transverse Front Engine Full Time All Wheel Drive

Gear ratios for this transmission.

Applications:
2001-2003 RAV4 1AZFE 2.0 (USA and Canada)

E353F 
5 Speed Transverse Front Engine Full Time All Wheel Drive

Gear ratios for this transmission.

Applications:
2000-2005 RAV4 1CD-FTV 2.0 D4-D

E354
5 Speed Transverse Front Engine

Gear ratios for this transmission.

Applications:
2003-2008 Avensis 1AZ-FE

E355
5 Speed Transverse Front Engine

Gear ratios for this transmission.

Applications:
2001-2005 1CD-FTV Avensis Verso

E356
5 Speed Transverse Front Engine

Gear ratios for this transmission.

Applications:
2001-2003 Avensis Verso Picnic 1AZ-FE

E357 
5 Speed Transverse Front Engine

Gear ratios for this transmission.

Applications:
2004-2006 CDE120 Corolla 1CD-FTV 2.0 D-4D
2003-2006 CDT250 Avensis 1CD-FTV 2.0 D4-D

E358 
5 Speed Transverse Front Engine

Gear ratios for this transmission.

Applications:

E359F
5 Speed Transverse Front Engine Full Time All Wheel Drive

Gear ratios for this transmission.

Applications:
2004-2005 RAV4 2AZFE 2.4

EA6x (Toyota version of the Aisin BG6)

EA60
 Lotus Evora Sport Ratio

 Lotus Evora Standard Ratio

EA62
 2009–2012 Toyota Avensis with 2AD-FHV engine

EA63
 2009–2012 Toyota Avensis with 2AD-FTV engine

EA64F
 2013–present Rav4 (4WD) (Australia)(2AD-FTV)(DIESEL)

EA65
 2009–2012 Toyota Avensis with 1AD-FTV engine

EA67F
 2020- Toyota GR Yaris with G16E-GTS engine
 2023- Toyota GR Corolla with G16E-GTS engine
Torsen Limited Slip Differential Optional

EA68F
 2023- Toyota GR Corolla Morizo Edition with G16E-GTS engine
Torsen Limited Slip Differential Equipped

EB6x (Toyota version of the Aisin BH6)

EB60
 2009–2012 Toyota Avensis with 3ZR-FAE engine
 2011–2016 Scion tC

EB61
 2013–present Rav4 (Australia)(3ZR-FE)

EB62
 2010–2011 Toyota Camry (XV40)
 2011-2013 Toyota Zelas

EB63F
 2013–present Rav4 (4WD) (Australia)(2AR-FE)

EC6x

EC60
 2009–2012 Toyota Avensis
 2014+ Toyota Corolla
 2012-2018 Toyota Auris/Scion iM/Toyota Corolla iM
 2014+ Lotus Elise
 2016+ Toyota Etios

Final drives

EExx

5/6 Speed Transverse Front-mid Engine used exclusively in the AJ10 Toyota iQ

EE53

Applications:
 Toyota iQ (KGJ10) - 1KR-FE 1.0L I3

EE63

Applications:
Toyota iQ (NGJ10) - 1NR-FE 1.3L I4
Toyota iQ (NGJ10) - 1NR-FE 1.3L I4 GRMN Supercharger

EE65

Applications:
Toyota iQ (NUJ10) - 1ND-FTV 1.4L I4 Turbo Diesel

E